Syed Murtaza Ali (1 July 1902 – 9 August 1981) was a Bangladeshi writer. He was the elder brother of writer and linguist Syed Mujtaba Ali. He is noted for his works relating to the histories of Chittagong, Sylhet and Jaintia.

Background and education
Ali's ancestral residence was at Uttarsur, Habiganj District. His father, Khan Bahadur Sikandar Ali, was a Sub-Registrar. He traced his paternal descent from Shah Ahmed Mutawakkil, a local holy man and a Syed of Taraf, though apparently unrelated to the region's ruling Syed dynasty. Ali's mother, Amatul Mannan Khatun, belonged to the Chowdhuries of Kala and Bahadurpur, an Islamised branch of the Pal family of Panchakhanda.

Ali passed his matriculation examination from Sylhet Government School in 1921 and passed his ISc from Murari Chand College in 1923. He earned his bachelor's in Physics from Presidency College, Calcutta.

Career
In 1926, he became the Magistrate of Maulvi Bazar subdivision. He was Sub-divisional Officer in 1940. Later he became the Under Secretary in the Education Department. He retired from civil service positions in 1959.

He served as the President of the Bangla Academy during 1969-1971 and 1975-1977 and Asiatic Society of Bangladesh in 1974.

Works
 Pashchim Pakistan (1952)
 The History of Jaintia (1954)
 History of Chittagong (1964)
 Hazrat Shah Jalal O Sylheter Itihas (1965). 
 Amader Kaler Katha (1968),
 Muztaba-Katha O Anyanya Prasanga (1976)
 Prabandha Bichitra (1967)

Awards
 Bangla Academy Literary Award (1973)
 Independence Day Award (1982)

References 

1902 births
1981 deaths
Bangladeshi male writers
Recipients of the Independence Day Award
Presidency University, Kolkata alumni
20th-century Bangladeshi historians
Recipients of Bangla Academy Award
People from Habiganj District
People from Karimganj district
20th-century Bengalis